A kit is a set of components that has to be assembled by the buyer or at the site of use to get the definitive product.

Examples:
 Electronic kit, a package of electrical components used to build an electronic device.
 Kit car ("component car"), an automobile that the buyer assembles into a functioning car
 Kit bike
 Folding kayak
 Tent
 Prefabricated building of houses
 provisional military engineering constructions like
 Mabey Logistic Support Bridge
 Space station
 Much of IKEA furniture
 A lot of kits are sold for model building

Construction
Kit cars